This is a demography of the population of Costa Rica including population density, ethnicity, education level, health of the populace, economic status, religious affiliations and other aspects of the population.

According to the United Nations, in  Costa Rica had an estimated population of  people. White and Mestizos make up 83.4% of the population, 7% are black people (including mixed race), 2.4% Amerindians, 0.2% Chinese and 7% other/none.

In 2010, just under 3% of the population is of African descent who are called Afro-Costa Ricans or West Indians and are English-speaking descendants of 19th-century black Jamaican immigrant workers. Another 1% is composed of those of Chinese origin, and less than 1% are West Asian, mainly of Lebanese descent but also Palestinians. The 2011 Census provided the following data: whites and mestizos make up 83.4% of the population, 7% are black people (including mixed race), 2.4% Amerindians, 0.2% Chinese, and 7% other/none.

There is also a community of North American retirees from the United States and Canada, followed by fairly large numbers of European Union expatriates (esp. Scandinavians and from Germany) come to retire as well, and Australians. Immigration to Costa Rica made up 9% of the population in 2012. This included permanent settlers as well as migrants who were hoping to reach the U.S. In 2015, there were some 420,000 immigrants in Costa Rica and the number of asylum seekers (mostly from Honduras, El Salvador, Guatemala and Nicaragua) rose to more than 110,000. An estimated 10% of the Costa Rican population in 2014 was made up of Nicaraguans.

The indigenous population today numbers about 60,000 (just over 1% of the population) with some Miskito and Garifuna (a population of mixed African and Carib Amerindian descent) living in the coastal regions.

Costa Rica's emigration is the smallest in the Caribbean Basin and is among the smallest in the Americas. By 2015 about just 133,185 (2.77%) of the country's people live in another country as immigrants. The main destination countries are the United States (85,924), Nicaragua (10,772), Panama (7,760), Canada (5,039), Spain (3,339), Mexico (2,464), Germany (1,891), Italy (1,508), Guatemala (1,162) and Venezuela (1,127).

Population and ancestry

The population is increasing at a rate of 1.5% per year. At current trends the population will increase to 9,158,000 in about 46 years. The population density is 94 people per square km, the third highest in Central America.

Approximately 40% lived in rural areas and 60% in urban areas. The rate of urbanization estimated for the period 2005–2015 is 2.74% per annum, one of the highest among developing countries. About 75% of the population live in the upper lands (above 500 meters) where temperature is cooler and milder.

The 2011 census counted a population of 4.3 million people distributed among the following groups: 83.6% whites or mestizos, 6.7% black mixed race, 2.4% Native American, 1.1% black or Afro-Caribbean; the census showed 1.1% as Other, 2.9% (141,304 people) as None, and 2.2% (107,196 people) as unspecified.

In 2011, there were over 104,000 Native American or indigenous inhabitants, representing 2.4% of the population. Most of them live in secluded reservations, distributed among eight ethnic groups: Quitirrisí (in the Central Valley), Matambú or Chorotega (Guanacaste), Maleku (northern Alajuela), Bribri (southern Atlantic), Cabécar (Cordillera de Talamanca), Guaymí (southern Costa Rica, along the Panamá border), Boruca (southern Costa Rica) and Térraba (southern Costa Rica).

The population includes European Costa Ricans (of European ancestry), primarily of Spanish descent, with significant numbers of Italian, German, English, Dutch, French, Irish, Portuguese, and Polish families, as well a sizable Jewish community. The majority of the Afro-Costa Ricans are Creole English-speaking descendants of 19th century black Jamaican immigrant workers.

The 2011 census classified 83.6% of the population as white or Mestizo; the latter are persons of combined European and Amerindian descent. The Mulatto segment (mix of white and black) represented 6.7% and indigenous people made up 2.4% of the population. Native and European mixed blood populations are far less than in other Latin American countries. Exceptions are Guanacaste, where almost half the population is visibly mestizo, a legacy of the more pervasive unions between Spanish colonists and Chorotega Amerindians through several generations, and Limón, where the vast majority of the Afro-Costa Rican community lives.

Education
According to the United Nations, Costa Rica's literacy rate stands at 95.8%, the fifth highest among American countries. Costa Rica's Education Index in 2006 was 0.882; higher than that of richer countries, such as Singapore and Mexico. Costa Rica's gross enrollment ratio is 73.0%, smaller than that of the neighbors countries of El Salvador and Honduras.

All students must complete primary school and secondary school, between 6 and 15 years. Some students drop out because they must work to help support their families. In 2007 there were 536,436 pupils enrolled in 3,771 primary schools and 377,900 students attended public and private secondary schools.

Costa Rica's main universities are the University of Costa Rica, in San Pedro and the National University of Costa Rica, in Heredia. Costa Rica also has several small private universities.

Emigration

Costa Rica's emigration is among the smallest in the Caribbean Basin. About 3% of the country's people live in another country as immigrants. The main destination countries are the United States, Spain, Mexico and other Central American countries. In 2005, there were 127,061 Costa Ricans living in another country as immigrants. Remittances were $513,000,000 in 2006 and they represented 2.3% of the country's GDP.

Immigration

Costa Rica's immigration is among the largest in the Caribbean Basin. According to the 2011 census 385,899 residents were born abroad. The vast majority were born in Nicaragua (287,766). Other countries of origin were  Colombia (20,514), United States (16,898), Spain (16,482) and Panama (11,250).  Outward Remittances were $246,000,000 in 2006.

Migrants
According to the World Bank, about 489,200 migrants lived in the country in 2010 mainly from Nicaragua, Panama, El Salvador, Honduras, Guatemala, and Belize, while 125,306 Costa Ricans live abroad in the United States, Panama, Nicaragua, Spain, Mexico, Canada, Germany, Venezuela, Dominican Republic, and Ecuador. The number of migrants declined in later years but in 2015, there were some 420,000 immigrants in Costa Rica and the number of asylum seekers (mostly from Honduras, El Salvador, Guatemala and Nicaragua) rose to more than 110,000, a fivefold increase from 2012. In 2016, the country was called a "magnet" for migrants from South and Central America and other countries who were hoping to reach the U.S.

European Costa Ricans

European Costa Ricans are people from Costa Rica whose ancestry lies within the continent of Europe, most notably Spain. According to DNA studies, around 75% of the population have some level of European ancestry.

Percentages of the Costa Rican population by race are known as the national census does have the question of ethnicity included in its form. As for 2012 65.80% of Costa Ricans identify themselves as white/castizo and 13.65% as mestizo, giving around 80% of Caucasian population. This, however, is based in self-identification and not in scientific studies. According to PLoS Genetics Geographic Patterns of Genome Admixture in Latin American Mestizos study of 2012, Costa Ricans have 68% of European ancestry, 29% Amerindian and 3% African. According to CIA Factbook, Costa Rica has white or mestizo population of the 83.6%.

Cristopher Columbus and crew were the first Europeans ever to set foot on what is now Costa Rica in Columbus last trip when he arrived to Uvita Island (modern day Limón province) in 1502. Costa Rica was part of the Spanish Empire and colonized by Spaniards mostly Castilians, Basque and Sefardi Jews. After the independence large migrations of wealthy Americans, Germans, French and British businessmen came to the country encouraged by the government and followed by their families and employees (many of them technicians and professionals) creating colonies and mixing with the population, especially the high and middle classes. Later, more humble migrations of Italians, Spanish (mostly Catalans) and Arab (mostly Lebanese and Syrians) migrants visit the country escaping economical crisis in their home countries, setting in large, more closed colonies. Polish migrants, mostly Ashkenazi Jews escaping anti-Semitism and nazi persecution in Europe also migrated to the country in large numbers. In 1901 president Ascensión Esquivel Ibarra closes the country to all non-white immigration forbidding the entrance of all Black, Chinese, Arab, Turkish or Gypsy migration in the country. After the beginning of the Spanish Civil War large migration of Republican refugees also settle in the country, mostly Castilians, Galicians and Asturians, as later Chilean, Mexican and Colombian migrants would leave their countries traveling to Costa Rica escaping from war or dictatorships as Costa Rica is the longest running democracy in Latin America.

Ethnic groups
The following listing is taken from a publication of the Costa Rica 2011 Census:
Mestizos and Whites -  3,597,847 = 83.64%
Mulatto -  289,209 = 6.72%
Indigenous - 104,143 = 2.42%
Black/Afro-Caribbean - 45,228 = 1.05%
Chinese - 9 170 = 0.21%
Other - 36 334 = 0.84%
Did not state - 95,140 = 2.21%

Vital statistics

Current vital statistics

Structure of the population 

Structure of the population (01.07.2017) (Estimates - the source of data is the national household survey):

Life expectancy at birth

Source: UN World Population Prospects

Demographic statistics
Demographic statistics according to the World Population Review in 2022.

One birth every 8 minutes	
One death every 19 minutes	
One net migrant every 131 minutes	
Net gain of one person every 12 minutes

Demographic statistics according to the CIA World Factbook, unless otherwise indicated.

Population
5,204,411 (2022 est.)
4,987,142 (July 2018 est.)
4,872,543 (July 2016 est.)

Ethnic groups
White or Mestizo 83.6%, Mulatto 6.7%, Indigenous 2.4%, Black or African descent 1.1%, other 1.1%, none 2.9%, unspecified 2.2% (2011 est.)

Age structure

0-14 years: 22.08% (male 575,731/female 549,802)
15-24 years: 15.19% (male 395,202/female 379,277)
25-54 years: 43.98% (male 1,130,387/female 1,111,791)
55-64 years: 9.99% (male 247,267/female 261,847)
65 years and over: 8.76% (2020 est.) (male 205,463/female 241,221)

0-14 years: 22.43% (male 572,172 /female 546,464)
15-24 years: 15.94% (male 405,515 /female 389,433)
25-54 years: 44.04% (male 1,105,944 /female 1,090,434)
55-64 years: 9.48% (male 229,928 /female 242,696)
65 years and over: 8.11% (male 186,531 /female 218,025) (2018 est.)

Median age
total: 32.6 years. Country comparison to the world: 109th
male: 32.1 years
female: 33.1 years (2020 est.)

Total: 31.7 years. Country comparison to the world: 109th
Male: 31.2 years 
Female: 32.2 years (2018 est.)

Total: 30.9 years
Male: 30.4 years
Female: 31.3 years (2016 est.)

Birth rate
14.28 births/1,000 population (2022 est.) Country comparison to the world: 121st
15.3 births/1,000 population (2018 est.) Country comparison to the world: 121st

Death rate
4.91 deaths/1,000 population (2022 est.) Country comparison to the world: 198th
4.8 deaths/1,000 population (2018 est.) Country comparison to the world: 200th

Total fertility rate
1.86 children born/woman (2022 est.) Country comparison to the world: 134th
1.89 children born/woman (2018 est.) Country comparison to the world: 135th

Net migration rate
0.77 migrant(s)/1,000 population (2022 est.) Country comparison to the world: 69th
0.8 migrant(s)/1,000 population (2018 est.) Country comparison to the world: 65th

Population growth rate
1.01% (2022 est.) Country comparison to the world: 95th
1.13% (2018 est.) Country comparison to the world: 95th

Contraceptive prevalence rate
70.9% (2018)

Religions
Roman Catholic 47.5%, Evangelical and Pentecostal 19.8%, Jehovah's Witness 1.4%, other Protestant 1.2%, other 3.1%, none 27% (2021 est.)

Dependency ratios
Total dependency ratio: 45.4 (2015 est.)
Youth dependency ratio: 32.4 (2015 est.)
Elderly dependency ratio: 12.9 (2015 est.)
Potential support ratio: 7.7 (2015 est.)

Urbanization

urban population: 82% of total population (2022)
rate of urbanization: 1.5% annual rate of change (2020-25 est.)

Infant mortality rate
Total: 8.3 deaths/1,000 live births
Male: 9 deaths/1,000 live births
Female: 7.4 deaths/1,000 live births (2016 est.)

Life expectancy at birth
total population: 79.64 years. Country comparison to the world: 58th
male: 76.99 years
female: 82.43 years (2022 est.)

Total population: 78.9 years. Country comparison to the world: 55th
Male: 76.2 years 
Female: 81.7 years (2018 est.)

Total population: 78.6 years 
Male: 75.9 years
Female: 81.3 years (2016 est.)

HIV/AIDS
Adult prevalence rate: 0.33%
People living with HIV/AIDS: 10,000
Deaths:200 (2015 est.)

Education expenditures
6.7% of GDP (2020) Country comparison to the world: 24th

Literacy
total population: 97.9%
male: 97.8%
female: 97.9% (2018)

School life expectancy (primary to tertiary education)
total: 17 years
male: 16 years
female: 17 years (2019)

Unemployment, youth ages 15-24
total: 40.7%
male: 34%
female: 50.9% (2020 est.)

Nationality
Noun: Costa Rican(s)
Adjective: Costa Rican

Languages
Spanish (official)
English

Sex ratio
At birth: 1.05 male(s)/female
0–14 years: 1.05 male(s)/female
15–24 years: 1.04 male(s)/female
25–54 years: 1.01 male(s)/female
55–64 years: 0.95 male(s)/female
65 years and over: 0.86 male(s)/female
Total population: 1.01 male(s)/female (2016 est.)

Major infectious diseases
degree of risk: intermediate (2020)
food or waterborne diseases: bacterial diarrhea
vectorborne diseases: dengue fever

Languages

Nearly all Costa Ricans speak Spanish; but many know English. Indigenous Costa Ricans also speak their own language, such as the case of the Ngobes.

Religions

According to the World Factbook the main religions are: Roman Catholic, 76.3%; Evangelical, 13.7%; Jehovah's Witnesses, 1.3%; other Protestant, 0.7%; other, 4.8%; none, 3.2%.

The most recent nationwide survey of religion in Costa Rica, conducted in 2007 by the University of Costa Rica, found that 70.5 percent of the population identify themselves as Roman Catholics (with 44.9 percent practicing, 25.6 percent nonpracticing), 13.8 percent are Evangelical Protestants, 11.3 percent report that they do not have a religion, and 4.3 percent declare that they belong to another religion.

Apart from the dominant Catholic religion, there are several other religious groups in the country. Methodist, Lutheran, Episcopal, Baptist, and other Protestant groups have significant membership. The Church of Jesus Christ of Latter-day Saints (LDS Church) claim more than 35,000 members and has a temple in San José that served as a regional worship center for Costa Rica, Panama, Nicaragua, and Honduras.

Although they represent less than 1 percent of the population, Jehovah's Witnesses have a strong presence on the Caribbean coast. Seventh-day Adventists operate a university that attracts students from throughout the Caribbean Basin. The Unification Church maintains its continental headquarters for Latin America in San José.

Non-Christian religious groups, including followers of Judaism, Islam, Taoism, Hare Krishna, Paganism, Wicca, Scientology, Tenrikyo, and the Baháʼí Faith, claim membership throughout the country, with the majority of worshipers residing in the Central Valley (the area of the capital). While there is no general correlation between religion and ethnicity, indigenous peoples are more likely to practice animism than other religions.

Article 75 of the Costa Rican Constitution states that the "Catholic, Apostolic, and Roman Religion is the official religion of the Republic". That same article provides for freedom of religion, and the Government generally respects this right in practice. The US government found no reports of societal abuses or discrimination based on religious belief or practice in 2007.

See also
Ethnic groups in Central America

References

External links
UNICEF Information about Costa Rica's Demographics
INEC. National Institute of Statistics and Census